David Robert Stevens, Baron Stevens of Ludgate (born 26 May 1936), is a British peer who was formerly one of two UKIP members in the House of Lords.

He was educated at Stowe School and Sidney Sussex College, Cambridge (MA, Economics).  He is the son of Arthur Edwin Stevens who was the creator of the first body-worn electronic hearing aid. He was the chairman of United Newspapers, 1981–1999.

He was created a life peer on 27 March 1987 taking the title Baron Stevens of Ludgate, of Ludgate in the City of London. He originally sat as a Conservative, but was expelled by the party in 2004 after he signed a letter in support of UKIP. He sat as an Independent Conservative but joined UKIP in 2012. In late 2018, he left UKIP to once again sit as an Independent Conservative.

Arms

References

Further reading

External links

1936 births
Alumni of Sidney Sussex College, Cambridge
Conservative Party (UK) life peers
Life peers created by Elizabeth II
Independent politicians in England
Living people
People educated at Stowe School
Informa
UK Independence Party life peers